Félix Cumbé, born Critz Sterlin (born on 4 August 1964), is a Haitian-Dominican singer and songwriter of merengue and bachata.

Biography 
Cumbé was born in Haiti and migrated to the Dominican Republic when he was 13 years old.

His musical debut took place in the 1980s with his single El Gatico written for Aníbal Bravo’s orchestra. His popularity increased with the themes Feliz Cumbé and Déjame Volver, which he sang along with Fernando Villalona.

He left Aníbal Bravo’s orchestra and formed his own orchestra but it eventually disappeared.

In 2012 he returned to the show business with Tu no ta pa mi (Y yo aquí como un ma’icón).

Cumbé is married and has 2 children.

Cumbé acquired the Dominican Republic citizenship in 2021.

Discography 
 Juanita la Cafetera (1987)
Fiesta Party (1992)
 La Fugadora (1995)
 Eso Si Ta' Duro (1997)
 Bachateando (1999)
 Rompe Corazones (1999)
El Inmigrante (2002)
 Eso Da Pa' To' (2002)

References

External links 

20th-century Dominican Republic male singers
20th-century Haitian male singers
Bachata singers
Merengue musicians
Haitian expatriates in the Dominican Republic
21st-century Dominican Republic male singers
Place of birth missing (living people)
Date of birth missing (living people)
Living people
Naturalized citizens of the Dominican Republic
1964 births